Ernest Alfred Sykes (27 December 1915 – 1997) was an English professional footballer who made eight appearances in the First Division of the Football League playing for Birmingham. He played as a full back.

Sykes was born in Temple Normanton, Derbyshire. He played for Sutton Town before joining Birmingham in March 1936. He made his debut on 10 April 1936, in a 2–2 draw at home to Manchester United. Sykes played only rarely over the next two seasons, and moved to Cardiff City in the 1939 close season. He played only three games for the club before the Football League was suspended for the duration of the Second World War, and retired in 1944.

References

1915 births
1997 deaths
People from North East Derbyshire District
Footballers from Derbyshire
English footballers
Association football fullbacks
Ashfield United F.C. players
Birmingham City F.C. players
Cardiff City F.C. players
English Football League players